Barbara Pierce Bush (June 8, 1925 – April 17, 2018) was the first lady of the United States from 1989 to 1993, as the wife of President George H. W. Bush, and the founder of the Barbara Bush Foundation for Family Literacy.  She previously was the second lady of the United States from 1981 to 1989 when her husband was vice president. Among her six children are George W. Bush, the 43rd president of the United States, and Jeb Bush, the 43rd governor of Florida.  She and Abigail Adams are the only two women to be the wife of one U.S. president and the mother of another.

Barbara Pierce was born in Manhattan, New York City.  She met George Herbert Walker Bush at the age of sixteen, and the two married in Rye, New York in 1945, while he was on leave during his deployment as a Naval officer in World War II.  They moved to Texas in 1948, where George later began his political career.

Periodic Siena College Research Institute surveys of historians have consistently ranked Bush in the upper-half of American first ladies.

Early life
Barbara Pierce was born on June 8, 1925, at Booth Memorial Hospital, which at that time was located at 314 East 15th Street in Manhattan, New York City, to Pauline Pierce (née Robinson) and Marvin Pierce. She was raised in the suburban town of Rye, New York. Her father later became president of McCall Corporation, the publisher of the popular women's magazines Redbook and McCall's. She had two elder siblings, Martha (1920–1999) and James (1922–1993), and a younger brother, Scott (1930–2022). Her ancestor Thomas Pierce Jr., an early New England colonist, was also an ancestor of Franklin Pierce, the 14th president of the United States. She was a fourth cousin, four times removed, of Franklin Pierce and Henry Wadsworth Longfellow.

Pierce and her three siblings were raised in a house on Onondaga Street in Rye. She attended Milton Public School from 1931 to 1937, Rye Country Day School until 1940 and later the boarding school Ashley Hall in Charleston, South Carolina, from 1940 to 1943. In her youth, Pierce was athletic and enjoyed swimming, tennis, and bike riding. Her interest in reading began early in life; she recalled gathering and reading with her family during the evenings.

Marriage and family

When Pierce was 16 and on Christmas vacation, she met George H. W. Bush (1924–2018) at a dance at the Round Hill Country Club in Greenwich, Connecticut; he was a student at Phillips Academy in Andover, Massachusetts. After 18 months, the two became engaged to be married, just before he went off to World War II as a Navy torpedo bomber pilot. He named three of his planes after her: Barbara, Barbara II, and Barbara III. When he returned on leave, she discontinued her studies at Smith College in Northampton, Massachusetts; two weeks later, on January 6, 1945, they were married at the First Presbyterian Church in Rye, New York, with the reception being held at The Apawamis Club. They were married 73 years until her death on April 17, 2018, the 2nd longest-married presidential couple in U.S. history.

For the first eight months of their marriage, the Bushes moved around the Eastern United States, to places including Michigan, Maryland, and Virginia, where George Bush's Navy squadron training required his presence.

Over the next 13 years, George and Barbara Bush had six children who, among them, gave the couple a total of 14 grandchildren and 12 great-grandchildren:

George Walker Bush (b. 1946), who married Laura Welch on November 5, 1977. They have twin daughters, and four grandchildren.
Pauline Robinson "Robin" Bush (1949–1953), who died of leukemia at age 3.
John Ellis "Jeb" Bush Sr. (b. 1953), who married Columba Garnica Gallo on February 23, 1974. They have three children, and four grandchildren.
Neil Mallon Bush (b. 1955), who married Sharon Smith in 1980; they divorced in April 2003. They have three children, three grandsons, and one granddaughter. Neil married Maria Andrews in 2004.
Marvin Pierce Bush (b. 1956), who married Margaret Molster in 1981. They have two children. 
Dorothy Walker "Doro" Bush Koch (b. 1959), who married William LeBlond in 1982; they divorced in 1990, and had two children. Dorothy married Robert P. Koch in June 1992; they have two children.

Texas years
After the war ended, George and Barbara had their first child while George was a student at Yale University. Famously, the child's very first words were "How's Barbara?" - a phrase he had heard echo from his father daily on his return from work. The young family soon moved to Odessa, Texas, where George entered the oil business. In September 1949, Barbara's mother was killed in a car accident in New York. Mrs. Bush was pregnant at the time with her second child, and was advised not to travel to attend the funeral. When the baby was born, she was named Pauline Robinson Bush in honor of Barbara's mother. The Bushes moved to the Los Angeles area for a time, and then to Midland, Texas, in 1950. The Bushes would move some 29 times during their marriage. Over time, Bush built a business in the oil industry and joined with colleagues to start up the successful Zapata Corporation. Barbara raised her children while her husband was usually away on business. In 1953, the Bushes' daughter, Robin, died of leukemia.

When their daughter Dorothy was born in August 1959, the Bushes moved from Midland to Houston. In 1963, George Bush was elected Harris County Republican Party chairman, in the first of what would become many elections. In 1964, he made his first run for a prominent political office—U.S. senator from Texas. Although he lost the election, the exposure that the Bush family received put George and Barbara on the national scene.

Political life
In 1966, George Bush was elected as a U.S. representative in Congress from Texas. Barbara raised her children while her husband campaigned and occasionally joined him on the trail. Over the ensuing years, George Bush was elected or appointed to several different positions in the U.S. Congress or the executive branch, or government-related posts, and Barbara Bush accompanied him in each case.

As the wife of a congressman, Barbara immersed herself in projects that piqued her interest; the projects included various charities and Republican women's groups in Washington, D.C. Though her husband lost a second bid for the Senate in 1970, President Richard Nixon appointed him the United States ambassador to the United Nations, which enabled Barbara to begin forming relationships in New York City with prominent diplomats. As the Watergate scandal heated up in 1973, Nixon asked Bush to become Chairman of the Republican National Committee; Barbara advised her husband to reject the offer because of the harsh political climate, but he accepted anyway.

Nixon's successor, Gerald Ford, appointed Bush head of the U.S. Liaison Office in the People's Republic of China in September 1974, and the Bushes relocated. She enjoyed the time that she spent in China and often rode bicycles with her husband to explore cities and regions that few Americans had visited. One year later (on December 1975), Bush was recalled to the U.S. to serve as Director of Central Intelligence, so having the CIA under his supervision, during a crucial time of legal uncertainty for the agency. During his one-year tenure, he was not allowed to share with Barbara the classified aspects of his activities; the ensuing sense of isolation, coupled with her perception that she was not achieving her goals while other women of her time were, plunged her into a depression. She did not seek professional help. Instead, she began delivering speeches and presentations about her time spent in the closed-off China, and volunteered at a hospice.

Barbara Bush defended her husband's experience and personal qualities when he announced his candidacy for President of the United States in 1980. She caused a stir when she said that she supported ratification of the Equal Rights Amendment and was pro-choice on abortion, placing her at odds with the conservative wing of the Republican party, led by California governor Ronald Reagan. Reagan earned the presidential nomination over her husband, who then accepted Reagan's invitation to be his running mate; the team was elected in 1980.

Second Lady of the United States (1981–1989)

Barbara Bush's eight years as second lady made her a household name. 
After her son Neil was diagnosed with dyslexia, she took an interest in literacy issues and began working with several different literacy organizations. She spent much time researching and learning about the factors that contributed to illiteracy—she believed homelessness was also connected—and the efforts underway to combat both. She traveled around the country and the world, either with the vice president on official trips or by herself. In 1984, she wrote a children's book, C. Fred's Story, which recounted the adventures of a family as related by their cocker spaniel, C. Fred. She donated all of the book's proceeds to literacy charities.

By the mid-1980s, Bush was comfortable speaking in front of groups, and she routinely spoke to promote issues in which she believed. She became famous for expressing a sense of humor and self-deprecating wit. During the 1984 presidential campaign, Barbara made headlines when she told the press that she could not say on television what she thought of vice presidential candidate Geraldine Ferraro, but "it rhymes with rich". After receiving criticism for the comment, Bush said she did not intend to insult Ferraro.

In 1988, Vice President Bush announced his candidacy for president to succeed the term-limited President Reagan. By this time, Barbara had experienced two presidential campaigns, but broke new ground by becoming the third candidate's spouse to speak at the national party convention that nominated her husband (after Eleanor Roosevelt in 1940 and Pat Nixon in 1972). She promised voters that she would be a traditional first lady and campaigned actively for her husband. The campaign at times focused on the large Bush family, and contrasted her with the incumbent first lady, Nancy Reagan, by highlighting her interest in domestic staples such as church, gardening, and time spent with family while placing less emphasis on style sense and fashion; she drew attention to both her famous white hair and disinterest in wearing designer clothes. She generally avoided discussion of political issues during the campaign, particularly those on which she and her husband differed, and those closely involved with the campaign have reported that she was actively involved in campaign strategy. Bush was elected in November 1988 and sworn in on January 20, 1989.

First Lady of the United States (1989–1993)

Activism 

Family literacy was Barbara Bush's cause as first lady, and she called it "the most important issue we have". She became involved with many literacy organizations, served on literacy committees and chaired many reading organizations. Eventually, she helped develop the Barbara Bush Foundation for Family Literacy. She continued to be dedicated to eliminating the generational cycle of illiteracy in America by supporting programs where parents and their young children are able to learn together. During the early 1980s, after statistics had shown that foreign-born immigrants from Latin America had nearly quintupled just since 1960, statistics showed that 35 million adults could not read above the eighth-grade level and that 23 million were not able to read beyond a fourth-grade level. Mrs. Bush appeared on The Oprah Winfrey Show to discuss the situation and spoke regularly on Mrs. Bush's Story Time, a national radio program that stressed the importance of reading aloud to children. Her children Jeb Bush and Dorothy Bush Koch serve as co-chairs of the Barbara Bush Foundation for Family Literacy. During her lifetime Mrs. Bush remained active in the foundation and served as honorary chair.

In 1991 Barbara Bush presented the sculptural composition «Make Way for Ducklings» (in the honor of Robert McCloskey and his book of the same name) to Raisa Gorbacheva. The monument is situated in Moscow near the Novodevichy Convent.

Mrs. Bush also spoke about her support for abortion access, LGBT rights, civil rights, and AIDS awareness.

Upon her death, then-President Donald Trump made a statement declaring, "Amongst [Mrs. Bush's] greatest achievements was recognizing the importance of literacy as a fundamental family value that requires nurturing and protection."

She was active in the White House Historical Association and worked to revitalize the White House Preservation Fund, which she renamed the White House Endowment Trust. The trust raises funds for the ongoing refurbishment and restoration of the White House. She met her goal of raising $25 million towards the endowment. The White House residence staff generally found Barbara Bush to be the friendliest and most easygoing of the First Ladies with whom they had dealt.

Barbara Bush became the first U.S. first lady to become a recipient of the Henry G. Freeman Jr. Pin Money Fund, receiving $36,000, most of which she gave to favorite charities.

Personal life and interests 
Bush was known for her affection for her pet English Springer Spaniel Millie and wrote a children's book about Millie's new litter of puppies. She even included Millie in her official White House portrait, painted by Candace Whittemore Lovely.

She was struck every day by "how much things had changed" for her and her husband since they became president and first lady. In place of a limousine, Bush tried to use a smaller car and travel by train and commercial aircraft for out-of-town trips. The heads of Bush's Secret Service detail were partially opposed to her wishes; the agents agreed to the small car but did not approve of the commercial air and train travel. At that time, the number of threats to the first lady was higher than that of the vice president. Bush still wanted to use public transportation despite the opposition of the Secret Service. She was put-off by the fact that her flights would be delayed while agents checked out the planes and luggage. The plane on which Bush traveled was nicknamed "Bright Star", in honor of the leukemia foundation her husband and Hugh Liedtke founded after her daughter Robin died.

She gave the Wellesley College commencement address in 1990; her speech was listed as #45 in American Rhetoric's Top 100 Speeches of the 20th Century (listed by rank).

During her husband's 1992 presidential campaign, Barbara Bush stated that abortion and homosexuality are personal matters and argued that the Republican Party should not take a stand on them, saying that "The personal things should be left out of, in my opinion, platforms and conventions." Her personal views on abortion were not known, although her friends reported at that time that she "privately supported abortion rights". She explained, "I hate abortions, but I just could not make that choice for someone else."

In March 1989, she disclosed that she had Graves' disease, which is an overactive thyroid ailment; the condition coincidentally affected her husband. It is rare for two biologically unrelated people in the same household to develop Graves disease within two years of each other. In June of that year, President Bush said of his wife that "...she is doing just fine. And I think her doctors would say the same thing. She's got this Grave's disease under control."

In 2002 she became an alumna initiate of the Texas Eta chapter of Pi Beta Phi at Texas A&M University. Bush chose this university due to it being the location of her husband's Presidential Library. She was a member of the Junior League of Houston.

In March 2019, in her last autobiography, it was revealed that at the time of her death, she no longer considered herself part of the Republican Party.

Post–White House years
Bush's husband ultimately went on to lose his bid for re-election to Bill Clinton. After leaving the White House, the couple resided at the River Oaks community in Houston, Texas, and at the Bush compound in Kennebunkport, Maine. Bush described January 20, 1993, the day of Bill Clinton's inauguration, a "tough day" for her and her husband. After returning to Houston, the two were visited by their son, George W. Bush, and at that point, Bush realized that she had not cooked in 12 years. She had difficulty driving a car on her own, and she did not drive far from home for a long time; her husband warned people to get out of the way if they saw her car. A month after her husband left office in February 1993, Bush was surprised when her husband booked them on the "Love Boat" ship Regal Princess. In April 1993, Bush and her husband had breakfast with the former British Prime Minister Margaret Thatcher, who was on an American speaking tour. Thatcher mentioned the most recent celebration of former President Ronald Reagan's birthday at the Ronald Reagan Presidential Library and Museum, where he orated the same card twice. Bush read about the incident after Reagan was diagnosed with Alzheimer's disease, which she called a "tragedy for both" the Reagans.

Bush attempted to persuade her son George W. Bush not to run for Governor of Texas in the 1994 gubernatorial election. She was convinced that he could not defeat Ann Richards, but he went on to win the election. Several days after he was sworn in as Governor of Texas, she went to a Distinguished Speakers Event at the LBJ Library for Lady Bird Johnson. There, she was introduced by her son, the new Governor of Texas, and the following day, received a letter from him dated January 18, 1995, in which he asserted that he would not be governor had it not been for her and George H. W. Bush. Mrs. Bush described the letter as having "moved" both her and her husband. On September 3, 1995, the Bushes went to Vietnam. This was "unbelievable" to Barbara because she "never expected to set foot in what had been North Vietnam. The Bushes first went to Hanoi and then to Ho Chi Minh City. They met with President Lê Đức Anh and party secretary Đỗ Mười. On September 28, 1995, the Bushes drove to Portland, Maine, for the announcement of the Barbara Bush Children's Hospital. Bush said her life was being stretched, adding, "Long after I am gone this hospital will be there with my name." The Bushes visited the children there, and Mrs. Bush started to recall her daughter Robin after seeing them. The Bushes returned home early that month.

Bush campaigned for her son George W. Bush after he announced his presidential campaign in June 1999. Throughout the country, she met with women who supported his campaign, but she remained doubtful of his chances of winning. The resentment toward the campaign continued with her rejection of any criticism of her son that was said in her presence. She refused to watch any of the debates, in contrast to her husband, who was willing to listen and watch every debate. This created friction between the couple.

Several schools have been named for her: three primary schools and two middle schools in Texas and an elementary school in Mesa, Arizona. Also named for her is the Barbara Bush Library in Harris County, Texas, and the Barbara Bush Children's Hospital at Maine Medical Center in Portland, Maine. She served on the Boards of AmeriCares and the Mayo Clinic, and headed the Barbara Bush Foundation for Family Literacy.

On March 18, 2003—two days before the beginning of the 2003 invasion of Iraq—her son George W. Bush was president when ABC's Good Morning America asked her about her family's television viewing habits. She replied:

Bush was visiting a Houston relief center for people displaced by Hurricane Katrina when she told the radio program Marketplace,

The remarks generated controversy. In 2006, it was revealed that Barbara Bush donated an undisclosed amount of money to the Bush–Clinton Katrina Fund on the condition that the charity do business with an educational software company owned by her son Neil Bush.

On October 3, 2008, Barbara Bush and her husband George opened the "George and Barbara Bush Center" on the University of New England waterfront Biddeford Campus a few miles north of Walker's Point. The George and Barbara Bush Center lays the foundation for the heritage of Barbara Bush in New England and houses "The Bush Legacy Collection", material securing the Bush legacy in Maine, including memorabilia on loan from the George H. W. Bush Presidential Library at Texas A&M University. Particular attention is given to the family's New England heritage and to Barbara Bush's love for Maine.

In a November 2010 interview with Larry King, Bush was asked about former Alaska Governor Sarah Palin. Bush remarked, "I sat next to her once, thought she was beautiful, and I think she's very happy in Alaska, and I hope she'll stay there." Palin responded, "I don't want to, sort of, concede that we have to get used to this kind of thing, because I think the majority of Americans don't want to put up with the blue-bloods—and I say it with all due respect, because I love the Bushes—but, the blue-bloods, who want to pick and choose their winners, instead of allowing competition to pick and choose the winners."

Bush was initially opposed to her son Jeb making a potential bid for the presidency; she believed that other families should have a try at the nation's highest office and that "we've had enough Bushes". However, she reversed her position and appeared in a campaign ad for him. Beginning in February 2016, she began campaigning for him in New Hampshire, an early voting state. Jeb Bush joked that a town hall meeting attended by his mother featured a larger gathering than town halls prior to her involvement. Concerning her son, she believed that Jeb was nearly too well-mannered, but also was confident that he is "decent and honest, and everything we need in a president". Bush weighed in on Donald Trump, who was Jeb's rival for the nomination. By her own admission, she said that she could not understand how women "can vote for someone who said what he said about Megyn Kelly". She also indicated that she had tired of Trump over the course of the campaign and due to her gender, she was "not crazy about what he says about women". During the CBS Republican debate in February 2016, Jeb defended his mother by saying she "is the strongest woman I know", to which Trump replied that Bush herself "should be running".

Bush and Abigail Adams are the only two women in United States history to have been both married to a president and the mother of a president.

Illnesses and death
Bush was diagnosed with Graves' disease in 1988. Later on, she developed congestive heart failure and chronic obstructive pulmonary disease (COPD). Bush was a heavy smoker for 25 years, quitting in 1968 when a nurse condemned her smoking in her hospital room after surgery.

In November 2008, Bush was hospitalized for abdominal pains and underwent small intestine surgery. She underwent aortic valve replacement surgery in March 2009.

Bush was hospitalized with pneumonia on New Year's Eve 2013 and was released from the hospital a few days later.

On April 15, 2018, her family released a statement regarding her failing health stating that she had chosen to be at home with family, desiring "comfort care" rather than further medical treatment. According to family spokesman Jim McGrath, her decision came as a result of "a series of recent hospitalizations".

Bush died in her Houston home at the age of 92 on April 17, 2018. Her son George W. Bush tweeted, "My dear mother has passed on at age 92. Laura, Barbara, Jenna, and I are sad, but our souls are settled because we know hers was [...] I'm a lucky man that Barbara Bush was my mother. Our family will miss her dearly, and we thank you all for your prayers and good wishes." President Donald Trump ordered flags to half-staff in Barbara Bush's memory, as he and First Lady Melania Trump sent condolences on the nation's behalf; saying: "As a wife, mother, grandmother, military spouse, and former First Lady, Mrs. Bush was an advocate of the American family...She will be long remembered for her strong devotion to country and family..." Former Presidents Jimmy Carter, Bill Clinton, Barack Obama, and Senator John McCain also sent condolences. Some foreign leaders including Queen Elizabeth II of the United Kingdom, Canadian Prime Minister Justin Trudeau, and Russian President Vladimir Putin sent their condolences as well.

Her funeral was held at St. Martin's Episcopal Church in Houston on April 21, 2018, with burial at the George Bush Presidential Library in College Station, Texas. Former Presidents Barack Obama, George W. Bush (son), Bill Clinton and George H. W. Bush (husband), and fellow First Ladies Melania Trump, Michelle Obama, Laura Bush (daughter-in-law) and Hillary Clinton were notable representatives who attended the service. Barbara Bush's son and Fmr. Governor Jeb Bush and Presidential Historian and Biographer Jon Meacham gave Eulogies. Former British Prime Minister John Major and former Canadian Prime Minister Brian Mulroney were also in attendance. Her husband was hospitalized the day after with an infection that led to sepsis.

Following her death, a cartoon by Marshall Ramsey, of The Clarion-Ledger, was widely circulated, showing Barbara being greeted by her daughter Robin (who died of leukemia at age 3 in the 1950s) upon her entry to heaven. The cartoon was shared by various people and relatives of the family, including George W.'s daughter, Jenna Bush Hager. She would be featured again in another Ramsey cartoon later on in December of that same year (following her husband George's death seven months later), where both she and Robin greeted George after he landed a TBM Avenger (the type of airplane he flew in the Navy during World War II) in heaven.

Her husband survived her by seven months, dying on November 30, 2018.

Awards and legacy

In 1982, Barbara Bush received the D.A.R. Medal of Honor from the Daughters of the American Revolution. She became a member in 1985 and continued her membership until her death.

In 1995, Bush received the Award for Greatest Public Service Benefiting the Disadvantaged, an award given out annually by Jefferson Awards. In 1997, she was the recipient of The Miss America Woman of Achievement Award for her work with literacy programs. In 1997, Bush received the Golden Plate Award of the American Academy of Achievement.

In 2016, she received honorary membership in Phi Beta Kappa from the University of Houston chapter.

Multiple schools are named after Barbara Bush. They include Barbara Bush Middle School in Irving, Texas in the Dallas-Fort Worth area, operated by the Carrollton-Farmers Branch Independent School District; Barbara Bush Elementary School in The Woodlands, Texas, in Greater Houston, operated by the Conroe Independent School District; Global Leadership Academy at Barbara Bush Elementary in Grand Prairie, Texas, also in Dallas-Fort Worth, operated by the Grand Prairie Independent School District; and Barbara Bush Elementary School in the Parkway Villages neighborhood in western Houston, operated by the Houston Independent School District.

The Barbara Bush Children's Hospital at Maine Medical Center was named in honor of first lady Barbara Bush for her long-standing commitment to children's issues around the world. It takes a great deal of support to start a children’s hospital. It was clear when the hospital was founded in 1995 that Mrs. Bush, a well-known advocate for literacy and the well-being of young people and part-time Maine resident, was someone who could help lead the way.

Historical assessments 
Since 1982 Siena College Research Institute has conducted occasional surveys asking historians to assess American first ladies according to a cumulative score on the independent criteria of their background, value to the country, intelligence, courage, accomplishments, integrity, leadership, being their own women, public image, and value to the president. In terms of cumulative assessment, Bush has been ranked:
7th-best of 37 in 1993
15th-best of 38 in 2003
12th-best of 38 in 2008
11th-best of 39 in 2014

In the 2003 survey, Bush was the ranked 5th-highest in the criteria of public image. In the 2008 Siena Research Institute survey, Bush was ranked the 9th-best of the twenty 20th century and 21st century First Ladies. In the 2014 survey, Bush and her husband were ranked the 21st-highest out of 39 first couples in terms of being a "power couple". In the 2014 survey, historians ranked Bush among 5th among 20th and 21st century American first ladies that they felt "could have done more".

Honorary degrees
Barbara Bush received honorary degrees from many institutions. These include:

Footnotes

References and primary sources
  Excerpt

Further reading
 Bush, Barbara. "BARBARA BUSH: A MEMOIR/Life after White House is fun and different ". Los Angeles Times. Syndicate at the Houston Chronicle. Saturday October 1, 1994. Houston Section, p. 5.
Emery, Christopher. White House Usher: Stories from the Inside. (2017), by a White House Usher (with a foreword by Barbara Bush). 
 Gould, Lewis L. "Modern first ladies in historical perspective." Presidential Studies Quarterly 15.3 (1985): 532–540. online
 Hummer, Jill Abraham. "First Ladies and the Cultural Everywoman Ideal: Gender Performance and Representation." White House Studies 9.4 (2009) pp. 403–422. Compares Lady Bird Johnson, Betty Ford, and Barbara Bush.
 Williams, Marjorie. "Barbara's Backlash". Vanity Fair. August 1992.

External links

 Official White House biography of Barbara Bush
 Bush, George H. W. and Barbara Bush with Jim McGrath. George H. W. Bush and Barbara Bush Oral History, Houston Oral History Project, July 2009.
 Commencement Address at Wellesley
 Barbara Bush Foundation for Family Literacy
 Past Winners of Harold W. McGraw, Jr. Prize in Education
 
 Barbara Bush at C-SPAN's First Ladies: Influence & Image
 

|-

 
1925 births
2018 deaths
20th-century American Episcopalians
20th-century American women writers
21st-century American Episcopalians
21st-century American women
20th-century American memoirists
American people of English descent
American women memoirists
Burials in Texas
Bush family
Daughters of the American Revolution people
First ladies of the United States
Members of the Junior League
Mothers of presidents of the United States
People from Midland, Texas
People from Rye, New York
Rye Country Day School alumni
Second ladies of the United States
Smith College alumni
Spouses of Texas politicians
Texas Republicans
Writers from Manhattan
Writers from Texas
Literacy advocates